At least four vessels of the Royal Navy have borne the name HMS Belette. (Belette is French for "weasel".)

HMS Belette was an 18-26-gun French Coquette-class corvette launched in 1781, that Royalists at Toulon surrendered to the British in 1793.
HMS Belette was the French 12-gun brig Belliqueuse, the name-ship of her class, launched in 1793 and sold in 1797 to serve as a privateer. The Royal Navy captured her in January 1798 and though the Admiralty named her HMS Belette and took her measurements, she was never commissioned; she was sold in 1801.
 was a  launched in 1806 and wrecked at Laeso in the Kattegat in 1812 with the loss of almost all her crew.
 was a Cruizer-class brig-sloop launched in 1814 but not completed until 1818. She was sold in 1828.

Citations and references
Citations

References
 
 
 

Royal Navy ship names